Saint Vincent and the Grenadines elects a legislature on the national level. The House of Assembly has 21 seats: 15 members elected for a five-year term in single seat constituencies and six appointed senators. 
Saint Vincent and the Grenadines has a two-party system, which means that there are two dominant political parties, with extreme difficulty for anybody to achieve electoral success under the banner of any other party.

Latest elections

See also
 Electoral calendar
 Electoral system

External links
Adam Carr's Election Archive
Elections archive and current results for 2005 by Cable and Wireless